Seguam Pass is a strait between the Bering Sea and the North Pacific Ocean in the Aleutian Islands in Alaska.  It lies between Seguam Island to the east and Amlia Island to the west.

Notes

References
Rand McNally New Universal World Atlas. Rand McNally and Company, 1994. .

Landforms of the Aleutian Islands
Straits of Aleutians West Census Area, Alaska
Straits of Alaska